K-1 Fighting Network Romania 2007 was a kickboxing event held by the K-1 organization in association with the Local Kombat promotion on Friday, May 4, 2007 at the Sala Polivalentă in Bucharest, Romania.

Background  
An eight-man elimination tournament was held to determine a heavyweight winner to advance to K-1 World GP 2007 in Amsterdam. This event also featured two prestige fights.

Results

Heavyweight tournament

See also
List of K-1 events
List of K-1 champions
List of male kickboxers

References

External links
K-1 Official site

K-1 events
2007 in kickboxing
Kickboxing in Romania
Sport in Bucharest